Vanessa Wallace (born 20 June 1977) is a British Paralympic athlete who competes in shot put and javelin events in international level events.

References

1977 births
Living people
People from Tottenham
Paralympic athletes of Great Britain
British female shot putters
British female javelin throwers
English female shot putters
English female javelin throwers
Athletes (track and field) at the 2016 Summer Paralympics
Medalists at the World Para Athletics Championships
Medalists at the World Para Athletics European Championships
Athletes (track and field) at the 2020 Summer Paralympics